Ikouwem Udo Utin  (born 11 November 1999) is a Nigerian international footballer who plays for Croatian club NK Slaven Belupo, as a left back.

Club career
Born in Akwa Ibom State, Udo began his career with Alaska Football Academy before moving to Enyimba at the age of 16. He made his senior debut in 2017. In February 2018 he won the NFF Young Player of the Year award. In May 2019 he signed for Israeli club Maccabi Haifa.

On 28 July 2020 he was loaned to Bnei Sakhnin until the end of the season.

In 4 September 2021 Udo signed with Croatian club NK Slaven Belupo.

International career
He made his international debut for Nigeria in 2018.

Honours
2018 NFF Young Player of the Year

References

1999 births
Living people
Sportspeople from Akwa Ibom State
Nigerian footballers
Nigeria international footballers
Enyimba F.C. players
Maccabi Haifa F.C. players
Bnei Sakhnin F.C. players
NK Slaven Belupo players
Nigeria Professional Football League players
Israeli Premier League players
Association football fullbacks
Nigerian expatriate footballers
Expatriate footballers in Israel
Nigerian expatriate sportspeople in Israel
Expatriate footballers in Croatia
Nigerian expatriate sportspeople in Croatia
Nigeria A' international footballers
2018 African Nations Championship players